Sofya Zhuk was the defending champion, but chose not to participate.

Irina Falconi won the title, defeating Louisa Chirico in the final, 7–5, 6–7(3–7), 6–1.

Seeds

Draw

Finals

Top half

Bottom half

References
Main Draw

Abierto Tampico - Singles